Encantada (Spanish and Portuguese for "charmed" or "enchanted") may refer to:

 Encantada, Texas, a census-designated place near Brownsville, Texas, USA
 Encantada, Mexico, a village in Coahuila, Mexico
 Casa Encantada, a famously expensive estate in Los Angeles, California, USA
 Hearst Castle, formerly known as La Cuesta Encantada, in San Simeon, California, USA
 La Encantada, a shopping center in Tucson, Arizona, USA
 La Encantada, Colón, a corregimiento in Panama
 La Encantada, a silver mine near Coahuila, Mexico, operated by First Majestic Silver
 La Encantada, a spirit in Spanish mythology and legend
 Anito, a spirit in Philippine mythology and legend, also known as La Encantada
 Isla Encantada, an island near Baja California, Mexico
 Sierra la Encantada, a mountain range in Coahuila, Mexico
 Ciudad Encantada, a geological site near Cuenca, Spain
 Ciudad Encantada de Bolnuevo, a geological site near Bolnuevo, Spain
 BM Ciudad Encantada, a soccer team in Cuenca, Spain
 Terra Encantada, an amusement park in Rio de Janeiro, Brazil
 Picacho del Diablo, a mountain in Baja California, Mexico, also known as Cerro de la Encantada
 Encantada, a ballet choreographed by Agnes Locsin

See also
 Galápagos Islands, formerly known as the Encantadas
 "The Encantadas", stories by Herman Melville
 The Encantadas, an orchestral composition by Tobias Picker 
 Enchanted Moura (Moura Encantada), a spirit in Portuguese mythology and legend
 Lagoa Encantada, a protected area in Bahia, Brazil
 Rancho Encantada, a neighborhood in San Diego, California, USA
 Lendas Encantadas, an album by the Brazilian band Apocalypse
 Roca Encantada House, a Heritage House in Buenavista in the Philippines
 Encantado (disambiguation), the masculine form of the same word
 Encantador (disambiguation), the agentive form of the same word
 La Encantadora, DC Comics cosmic entity supervillain
 Erinnyis ello, a species of moth with the subspecies E. ello encantada